Bogdan Bogdanović may refer to:
Bogdan Bogdanović (architect) (1922–2010), Serbian architect
Bogdan Bogdanović (basketball) (born 1992), Serbian basketball player

See also
Bojan Bogdanović (born 1989), Croatian basketball player